Muhammed Cham Saračević (born 26 September 2000) is an Austrian professional footballer who plays as a midfielder for French  club Clermont and the Austria national team.

Club career
Cham began his career at SC Red Star Penzing. In October 2008 he left Austria. Until 2016 he then played in Germany in the youth team of Hannover 96. For the 2016–17 season he moved to the B-Juniors of VfL Wolfsburg, where he made 22 appearances in the B-Junioren-Bundesliga in that season.

In August 2017, he played against Hertha BSC for the first time for the U-19 team in the A-Junior Bundesliga. In the 2017–18 season he played 15 games in which he scored three goals. In the 2018–19 season he made 22 appearances and became champions of the Gruppe Nord/Nordost with Wolfsburg. Therefore, he took part in the finals with Wolfsburg, which they lost to VfB Stuttgart.

For the 2019–20 season, Cham was promoted to the Wolfsburg's second team, VfL Wolfsburg II. He made his debut for them in the Regionalliga in July 2019 when he came on as a substitute for Julian Justvan in the 80th minute on the second match day of that season against BSV Schwarz-Weiß Rehden. After three appearances for Wolfsburg II, he returned to Austria in September 2019 and moved to Bundesliga club FC Admira Wacker Mödling.

He made his Austrian Football Bundesliga debut in the same month when he was in the starting line-up against SKN St. Pölten on matchday eight of that season and was replaced by Erwin Hoffer in the 65th minute. He made a total of 18 Bundesliga appearances for Admira. On 6 October 2020, he moved to France to the second division club Clermont Foot, who however directly loaned him to the Danish 1st Division club Vendsyssel FF for the 2020–21 season.

On 13 July 2021, he returned to Austria, joining Austria Lustenau on a season-long loan.

International career
Cham was born in Austria, and is of Bosnian and paternal Senegalese descent. He was called up to the Austria national team for a set of UEFA Nations League matches in September 2022. He made his debut on 25 September 2022 in a Nations League game against Croatia.

Career statistics

Club

International

Honours
Austria Lustenau
 Austrian Football Second League: 2021–22

References

External links
 
 
 Muhammed Cham Saračević at ÖFB
 

Living people
2000 births
Footballers from Linz
Austrian footballers
Association football midfielders
Austria under-21 international footballers
Austria youth international footballers
Austria international footballers
Austrian people of Senegalese descent
Austrian people of Bosnia and Herzegovina descent
Regionalliga players
Austrian Football Bundesliga players
Danish 1st Division players
2. Liga (Austria) players
VfL Wolfsburg II players
FC Admira Wacker Mödling players
Clermont Foot players
Vendsyssel FF players
SC Austria Lustenau players
Austrian expatriate footballers
Austrian expatriate sportspeople in Germany
Expatriate footballers in Germany
Austrian expatriate sportspeople in Denmark
Expatriate men's footballers in Denmark